Constance May "Connie" Scofield (born 26 May 1999) is an English professional football player who plays as midfielder for FA WSL club Leicester City.  She previously played for Birmingham City and is a product of Blues Ladies development centre which she joined at age nine.

Career statistics

Club

References

External links
 Soccerway profile

1999 births
Living people
English women's footballers
Birmingham City W.F.C. players
Leicester City W.F.C. players
Coventry United W.F.C. players
Women's Super League players
Women's association football midfielders
England women's under-21 international footballers